Corymbia lenziana, commonly known as the narrow-leaved bloodwood, is a species of small tree that is endemic to Western Australia. It has rough, tessellated bark on the trunk and branches, narrow lance-shaped to linear leaves, flower buds in groups of seven, white flowers and shortened spherical fruit.

Description
It has rough, tessellated, brownish bark on the trunk and branches. Flowering has been observed in March and the flowers are white.

This species is similar to C. eremaea and is distinguished from it mainly on the basis of its habit (a straggly, small tree) and habitat (not in rocky places nor on the crest of sand dunes).

Taxonomy and naming
Narrow-leaved bloodwood first formally described in 1985 by Denis Carr and Stella Carr and was given the name Eucalyptus lenziana. In 1995 Ken Hill and Lawrie Johnson changed the name to Corymbia lenziana. The specific epithet (lenziana) honours Janette Rosemary Lenz (born 1948).

Distribution and habitat
Corymbia lenziana grows in mulga on sandplain and on low rises in desert or semi-desert sand dunes from inland of Shark Bay to east of Wiluna in the Carnarvon, Central Ranges, Gascoyne and Murchison biogeographic regions of Western Australia.

Conservation status
This eucalypt is classified as "not threatened" by the Western Australian Government Department of Parks and Wildlife.

See also
 List of Corymbia species

References

lenziana
Myrtales of Australia
Rosids of Western Australia
Plants described in 1985
Taxa named by Maisie Carr